A garrison is a unit of troops or its headquarters.

Garrison can also refer to:

People
 Garrison (name)

Place names
 Australia
 Garrison Point, Sydney
Barbados
 The Garrison (see Garrison Historic Area), a military post
Canada
 Garrison Creek (Ontario), Toronto
Northern Ireland
 Garrison, County Fermanagh, a village
United States
 Garrison Channel, Tampa, Florida
 Garrison, Iowa, a city
 Garrison, Kentucky, an unincorporated community and census-designated place
 Garrison, Maryland, a census-designated place
 Garrison Township, Crow Wing County, Minnesota
 Garrison, Minnesota, a small city within the township
 Garrison, Missouri, an unincorporated community
 Garrison, Montana, a census-designated place
 Garrison, Nebraska, a village
 Garrison, New York, a hamlet across the Hudson River from the U.S. Military Academy at West Point
 Garrison, North Dakota, a small city
 Garrison Dam, North Dakota, directly south of the city of Garrison
 Garrison, Texas, a city
 Garrison, Utah, an unincorporated community

Stations
 Garrison station (Metro-North), a train station in New York state
 Garrison station (RTD), a light rail station in Colorado

Other uses
 Garrison (architecture), a type of house
 Garrison Library, Gibraltar
 Garrison Tower, Isles of Scilly
 Garrison (band), a post-hardcore band from Boston (1996–2004)
 Garrison cap, a foldable military cap